In phonetics, a bilabial consonant is a labial consonant articulated with both lips.

Frequency 
Bilabial consonants are very common across languages. Only around 0.7% of the world's languages lack bilabial consonants altogether, including Tlingit, Chipewyan, Oneida, and Wichita.

Varieties
The bilabial consonants identified by the International Phonetic Alphabet (IPA) are:

Owere Igbo has a six-way contrast among bilabial stops: .

Other varieties 
A lip-smack in the non-percussive sense of the lips noisily parting would be .

The IPA chart shades out bilabial lateral consonants, which is sometimes read as indicating that such sounds are not possible.

See also
 Place of articulation
 Index of phonetics articles

References

Citations

Sources 
 General references

 
 McDorman, Richard E. (1999). ''Labial Instability in Sound Change: Explanations for the Loss of /p/'l.  H'. Chicago: Organizational Knowledge Press. .

Place of articulation